Maka Mary (born 27 March 1989) is a French professional footballer who plays as a defender.

Career
Mary made his professional debut for Le Havre AC on 3 May 2009 in a Ligue 1 game against FC Nantes being introduced into the match in the 55th minute in place of Kana-Biyik.

He played for Bastia from 2010 to 2014.

On 2 August 2016, he signed for Paris FC.

In August 2017, Mary was one of four new signings announced by SC Bastia, which had played in Ligue 1 in the 2016–17 season but dropped to the fifth-tier Championnat National 3 after filing bankruptcy.

Club statistics

Club

References

External links
 

Living people
1989 births
French people of Malian descent
Footballers from Le Havre
Association football defenders
French footballers
Ligue 1 players
Ligue 2 players
Le Havre AC players
SC Bastia players
Paris FC players